The Jacobins were a political club during the French Revolution.

Jacobin may also refer to:

 Jacobin (politics), a member of the Jacobin club, or political radical, generally
 Jacobin (hummingbird), two species of hummingbirds from the genus Florisuga
 Jacobin (magazine), an American leftist political magazine
 Jacobin (pigeon), a breed of domestic pigeon
 Jacobin violet, another name for the French wine grape Pascal blanc
 The Jacobin, an opera by Antonín Dvořák
 The Black Jacobins, a book about the Haitian revolution by C.L.R. James
 Dominican Order, the Catholic religious order known in France as the Jacobin Order

See also
 
 Jacobina
 Jacobini
 Jacobean (disambiguation)
 Jacobite (disambiguation)
 Jacobitism, support for the House of Stuart